Indarbela manes is a moth in the family Cossidae first described by Herbert Druce in 1898. It is located primarily in Panama.

References

Metarbelinae
Moths described in 1898